Terrence Williams (born 11 January 1948) is a Welsh retired rock drummer. During the 1970s and early 1980s Williams was drummer with Dave Edmunds / Rockpile and Man. Rockpile split in 1981 and Williams joined Dire Straits from 1982 until 1988.

Williams was born in Swansea. During the 1960s, he played in a number of Welsh bands, including Commancheros, The Smokeless Zone, Dream and Plum Crazy, before joining Dave Edmunds' band Love Sculpture. In 1970 he joined the Welsh rock group Man, which included two former Dream and Smokeless Zone members, Deke Leonard and Martin Ace. With Man, he originally appeared on seven Studio albums, three Live albums and two Various artists, live albums, and has subsequently appeared on a number of retrospective releases. When Man split in 1976, Williams rejoined Edmunds in the band Rockpile with Nick Lowe and Billy Bremner, and continued working with Leonard.

Between 1981 and 1982, Williams was part of the Neverland Express band, backing Meat Loaf. In June 1982 Williams joined Dire Straits as the replacement for drummer Pick Withers, shortly after the release of their fourth studio album Love Over Gold. Williams played with them for the first time on the 1983 EP titled ExtendedancEPlay (featuring the hit single "Twisting by the Pool") and on the 1982–1983 Love over Gold Tour. The band's double live album Alchemy: Dire Straits Live was a recording of excerpts from the final two concerts from that tour at London's Hammersmith Odeon in July 1983, featuring Williams, and was released in March 1984. In 1983 Dire Straits frontman Mark Knopfler wrote and produced the music score for the film Local Hero, which also featured Williams.

Williams remained with Dire Straits for the recording of their fifth studio album, 1985's Brothers in Arms, however according to a Sound on Sound magazine interview with co-producer Neil Dorfsman his drumming performance was considered to be unsuitable for the desired sound of the album during the first month of the recording sessions, and he was temporarily replaced by jazz session drummer Omar Hakim, who re-recorded the album's drum parts during a two-day stay and then left. Both Hakim and Williams are credited on the album, although Williams' contribution on the finished album was the song "Walk of life" and the improvised crescendo at the beginning of "Money for Nothing". In another interview with Neil Dorsman, Williams played toms and tom fills throughout “Money for Nothing”, while Omar Hakim played drums on all the remaining tracks on the album, although Williams featured in the music videos for all the hit singles. Williams was back in Dire Straits as a full time member for the hugely successful 1985–1986 Brothers in Arms world tour that followed.

After a hiatus of almost two years, Dire Straits regrouped with Eric Clapton to perform at the Nelson Mandela 70th Birthday Tribute concert staged on 11 June 1988 at Wembley Stadium, in which they were the headline act. This was one of the final concerts in which Terry Williams played with Dire Straits. In September 1988 Mark Knopfler announced the official disbanding of Dire Straits and Williams then left the band. The compilation album Money for Nothing was released in October 1988 and featured selections from Williams’ 1982-85 tenure with the band. Dire Straits did a charity concert in Newcastle in 1989 with Terry on drums. This was his last concert ever with the band. Dire Straits regrouped in 1990 and again in 1991 without Williams as drummer.

In 1988, Williams played drums on albums by Graham Parker and Nick Lowe.

In 1996, Williams briefly rejoined Man, after John Weathers left, but he departed the following year. He also played in concerts such as the 50th birthday tribute to John Lennon and the 60th birthday of Chuck Berry.

Williams ran a blues club in Swansea from 2000 until 2007.

Discography

With Billy Bremner
 Bash! (1984)

With Carlene Carter
 Carlene Carter (1978)
 Musical Shapes (1980)
 C'est C Bon (1983)

With Cliff Richard
 Rock Connection (1984)

With Dave Edmunds / Rockpile
 Rockpile (1972)
 Get It (1977)
 Tracks on Wax 4 (1978)
 Repeat When Necessary (1979)
 Seconds of Pleasure (1980)
 Twangin... (1981)
 Riff Raff/I Hear You Rockin (2002) compilation
 They Call It Rock

With Deke Leonard
 Iceberg (1973)
 Kamikaze (1974)
 Before Your Very Eyes (1981)

With Dion
 Yo Frankie (1989)

With Dire Straits
 ExtendedancEPlay (1983)
 Alchemy: Dire Straits Live (1984)
 Brothers in Arms (1985)
 Money for Nothing (1988) compilation
 Sultans of Swing: The Very Best of Dire Straits (1998) compilation
 The Best of Dire Straits & Mark Knopfler: Private Investigations (2005) compilation

With Graham Parker
 The Mona Lisa's Sister (1988)
 Passion Is No Ordinary Word (1993) 1976-1991 era compilation
 No Holding Back (1996) compilation
 Ultimate Collection (2001) compilation

With John Illsley
 Never Told a Soul (1984)
 K. Wallis B. And The Dark Shades Of Night – Diamonds (1987)

With Man
 To Live for to Die (1970)
 Man (1971)
 Do You Like It Here Now, Are You Settling In? (1971)
 Greasy Truckers Party (1972)
 Live at the Padget Rooms, Penarth (1972)
 Be Good to Yourself at Least Once a Day (1972)
 Live at the Rainbow 1972 (1972)
 Christmas at the Patti (1973)
 Back into the Future (1973)
 Rhinos, Winos, and Lunatics (1974)
 Slow Motion (1974)
 1999 Party Tour (1974)
 Maximum Darkness (1975)
 The Welsh Connection (1976)
 All's Well That Ends Well (1977)
 Rare Man (1999) 
 Undrugged (2002) (1996 sessions)

With Mark Knopfler
 Local Hero (1983)
 Cal (soundtrack) (1984)
 Comfort and Joy (1984)
 Screenplaying (1993) compilation

With Mickey Jupp
 Juppanese (1978)

With The Motors
 Tenement Steps (1980)

With Nick Lowe
 Jesus of Cool (Pure Pop for Now People in US) (1978)
 Cruel to Be Kind (1979) 
 Labour of Lust (1979)
 Nick the Knife (1982)
 16 All Time Lowes (1984) compilation
 Nick's Knack (1986) compilation
 Pinker and Prouder than Previous (1988)
 Quiet Please... The New Best of Nick Lowe (2009) compilation

With Paul Brady 
 Full Moon (1986)

With The Everly Brothers
 Phil Everly (1983)
 EB 84 (1984)
 Mercury Years (1993) compilation

With Tina Turner
 Private Dancer (1984)
 Simply the Best (1991) compilation

With Tracey Ullman
 You Caught Me Out (1984)
 Takes on the Hits (2002) compilation

With Willie and the Poor Boys (Bill Wyman)
 Willie and the Poor Boys (1985)
 Poor Boy Boogie (2006) compilation

Also
Stiffs Live (1978) Plays with: Nick Lowe's Last Chicken in the Shop, Larry Wallis' Psychedelic Rowdies and Ian Dury & the Blockheads

References

1948 births
Living people
Welsh rock drummers
British male drummers
Dire Straits members
Neverland Express members
Musicians from Swansea
Rockpile members
The Motors members
Man (band) members